Three Preludes may refer to:

 Three Preludes (Gershwin)
 Three Preludes (Muczynski)
 Three Preludes (ballet), a 1992 ballet by Mark Morris